The 1988–89 season was Port Vale's 77th season of football in the English Football League, and third successive (18th overall) season in the Third Division. They achieved promotion to the Second Division with a 2–1 aggregate win over Bristol Rovers in the two-legged play-off Final. This came after a long season in which Vale, who suffered an injury crisis in the second half of the season, were just pipped to the second automatic promotion spot by Sheffield United. The club also reached the third round of the FA Cup, Second Round of the League Cup, and the preliminary round of the Associate Members' Cup. John Rudge's main stars were top-scorer Darren Beckford, strike partner Ron Futcher, defender Simon Mills, midfielders Ray Walker and Robbie Earle, and Player of the Year Mark Grew. Returning star Andy Jones was disappointing in his loan spell, but Andy Porter and Dean Glover both made their débuts in what was Phil Sproson's last season at the club.

Overview

Third Division
The pre-season saw Vale Park given a £40,000 upgrade to repair the floodlights, whilst a £20,000 electronic scoreboard was installed at the Hamil End. Three executive boxes were also purchased from Newcastle United, whilst facilities were opened to the local community. Manager John Rudge made a £40,000 offer for Bristol City's left-sided midfielder Alan Walsh, which was rejected. He also made inquiries for Nigel Gleghorn and Marc North. Ray Walker put in a transfer request, which was rejected. Rudge's first purchase of the season was Sunderland's left-sided midfielder Paul Atkinson, with a tribunal setting the fee at £20,000; Rudge stated that he "has the ability to produce the sort of crosses that win games". His next target was a striker, though he had a £70,000 bid for Hull City's Andy Saville rejected. Attempts to capture Imre Varadi, Wayne Biggins, Keith Bertschin, Andy Jones, and John Pearson all failed. Ian Moores began training with the club, but was not offered a contract. Despite interest from at least three other clubs (particularly Mansfield Town), Rudge signed Ron Futcher, Bradford City's top-scorer, for a £35,000 fee. The veteran striker said "I could have done better for myself elsewhere, but Vale have a lot more potential." Another new arrival was young Brighton & Hove Albion goalkeeper Trevor Wood on a free transfer. The Vale were unbeaten in their seven pre-season friendlies, beating second tier rivals Stoke City 1–0 in the process. They also recorded wins over Newcastle Town (6–1), Brandon (2–1), Spennymoor (3–0), and Kidderminster Harriers (4–0), and drew 2–2 with Walsall and 1–1 with Crewe Alexandra. Having failed to sign Phil Turner, Rudge felt the squad's one weakness was a lack of depth in defence.

The season opened with a 4–2 win over Preston North End on a plastic pitch at Deepdale. David Riley "discussed a transfer", but remained at the club despite being unhappy at starting the season from the bench. A weak defensive performance then cost them at home to Chester City, though Rudge was happy with the performance of Simon Mills, a midfielder who was learning a new position at right-back. A disciplined performance was enough to win a point away at Bury, with goalkeeper Mark Grew in impressive form. With Atkinson injured and Steve Harper out of form, Rudge tried unsuccessfully to bring in Liverpool's Steve Staunton and Bournemouth's Mark O'Connor on loan. The campaign though kicked into gear with "a stunningly ruthless" 6–1 thrashing of "a by no means inadequate" Cardiff City. They followed this up with a 5–0 mauling of a "dreadful" Chesterfield – Darren Beckford claiming a hat-trick – and moved to the top of the table. They ended September with a 1–0 win over Bristol City, as the Vale defence proved its effectiveness.

Vale opened October with a 3–3 draw with Wolverhampton Wanderers at Molineux; it was an exciting encounter, as Vale's short passing game proved the equal of the dangerous long ball game of "Wolves". Two days later they claimed a 2–0 victory over Huddersfield Town, with Trevor Wood keeping a clean sheet on his debut after Grew was sidelined with a thigh strain. A 2–0 win over injury-stricken Wigan Athletic at Springfield Park was the club's fifth clean sheet in six league games. Rudge meanwhile agreed a £175,000 deal to bring Andy Jones back from Charlton Athletic, but the striker refused the deal. Yet an injury-time goal from Ray Walker was enough to continue the team's fine run, as a solid Bolton Wanderers outfit were beaten 2–1; despite still suffering from injury, Grew made a series of impressive saves. With goalkeeper Mark Grew out with a thigh strain, Mike Stowell was taken in on loan from Everton. The month ended poorly, as a 3–2 loss to Blackpool at Bloomfield Road was followed by a 3–3 draw with Sheffield United in front of 13,246 fans (the biggest gate for a league game since 1973). The two northern sides exploited Vale's unease at playing with a new goalkeeper, and forced errors from the Vale defence with high-pressure aerial bombardment. On 29 October, Rudge kept the team in the dressing room for 45 minutes at Griffin Park after a poor performance left the distinctly average home side, Brentford, to secure all three points.

Vale were 13 minutes from opening November with a 3–1 home win over Aldershot when the match had to be abandoned due to fog. They instead found a much needed win away at Northampton Town. Rudge attempted to sign one of West Ham United's defensive pair Gary Strodder and Paul Hilton, but found their neither were willing to join the club. Unaffected by this rejection, the "Valiants" beat third-place Swansea City 2–1, though were disappointed to lose Futcher as the striker was sent off for arguing with the linesman. They then disposed of Fulham with a 3–0 win, despite having to play without Futcher. Rudge was made Manager of the Month.

December began with a 1–1 draw at Southend United, as Vale battled to an away point despite playing most of the second half with ten men following Atkinson's dismissal. With Atkinson injured, John Jeffers was taken on loan from Liverpool, though David Riley's form kept Jeffers on the bench. On 17 December, Vale overcame Reading 3–0 to hit second in the table. On Boxing day, Vale recorded a 1–0 win at Mansfield Town despite having Ray Walker sent off. They then missed the chance to end the calendar year on top of the table after falling to a 1–0 loss at relegation fodder Gillingham. Before the year was out, Paul Millar was signed from Irish club Portadown for £20,000, but severely damaged his knee ligaments in one of his early training sessions. Gary Ford also picked up an Achilles injury, and Vale's form suffered.

By January Wolves were clear at the top, and Vale were comfortably placed in second. Vale narrowly beat Notts County and Chester City to give themselves some breathing space. On 18 January, Rudge agreed to sign a new two-year contract. However Vale began to struggle, as Bury and Cardiff City inflicted two straight losses. Yet a back injury forced Bob Hazell into retirement, whilst Ray Walker had trouble with his foot. More bad news came when loyal servant Phil Sproson retired on medical advice after sustaining a bad knee injury.  Rudge responded by trying to bolster his defence, but was unable to secure Steve Sims, Peter Swan, Simon Morgan, Chris Hemming, or Peter Skipper. Rudge then took the decision to sign classy defender Dean Glover from Middlesbrough for £200,000, as a replacement for Sproson. This more than quadrupled the club's previous transfer record. Andy Jones also agreed to join the club on loan to boost the club's promotion chances.

On 4 February, a crowd of 16,362 witnessed a goalless home draw with leaders Wolves; débutante Dean Glover was impressive. Rudge then spent £70,000 on Gillingham defender Gary West, as it became clear that Bob Hazell would be out injured for a long time. On 11 February, Vale won their first ever point in an away match at Huddersfield. Two days later they battled against the elements to record a 3–0 victory over Aldershot in the re-arranged fixture. Rudge tried to re-sign another former Vale favourite on loan, Mark Chamberlain, but was turned down. The good results continued though, as Vale rounded out the month with a win over Wigan Athletic and a draw with Sheffield United at Bramall Lane.

A Futcher penalty opened March with a win over Blackpool, though Vale also had two goals disallowed. Preston then purchased young reserve winger Steve Harper, who wanted to "prove himself", for £35,000. Vale played a five-man defence against relegation candidates Aldershot, and came away from the Recreation Ground with a 2–2 draw as Rudge bemoaned "two points thrown away". They returned to winning ways against Brentford, but could only manage a draw at home to Preston. Rudge refused Reading's offer of £250,000 for Dean Glover, but placed Hazell on the transfer list. He did though sign Jeffers permanently for £30,000 after giving up hope of Atkinson returning to fitness. He also re-signed Ronnie Jepson from Nantwich Town, though attempts to loan in Jim Melrose from Shrewsbury Town were unsuccessful. On 25 March, Beckford hit a hat-trick as Vale claimed a 4–1 victory at Notts County to go ten games unbeaten. Two days later though, they fell to defeat at home to Mansfield.

April began with a 3–0 defeat at Reading after the team put in a "woefully inadequate display". They then claimed a draw at promotion rivals Bristol Rovers, though Rudge said that "we deserved to win". They were then fortunate to hang on to second place after making tough work of what should have been a routine home win over Gillingham. Gary Ford was ruled out for the rest of the season as injuries began to take their toll on the squad, though they still managed to return from Chesterfield with another three points. However they dropped down to third after losing at home to Bristol City. Vale then returned from Bolton with only a point, and were forced to contend with another injury as Riley suffered a broken leg. More points were dropped after a goalless draw at home to Swansea, the lack of goals being blamed on poor service from the flanks.

On 1 May, Vale lost at home to Northampton Town after wasting chances to score and making mistakes in defence. A young Andy Porter helped to ensure three victories in the final three games, but it was too late to gain automatic promotion. Going into the play-offs Rudge said that "We have almost climbed Everest, but there is one small hill to go and the players must be in a positive mood."

They finished in third place with 84 points, missing out on automatic promotion due to Sheffield United's superior goal difference. The team were unfortunate not to win automatic promotion, as the old system of two points for a win would have seen them finish second, and their tally of 84 points would have won them promotion in the Second Division and would have been enough to clinch the Fourth Division title. No team in the division conceded fewer than Vale's 48 goals, and Vale also had the best away record in the division. However relegated Southend lost fewer home games than the Vale. Ray Walker was selected for the PFA's Third Division Team of the Year for the second season running. However it was goalkeeper Mark Grew who was voted Port Vale F.C. Player of the Year.

Facing Preston North End in the play-off semi-finals, at Deepdale there was a pitch invasion by fans after a fire erupted under the wooden slats of the stands. Stoke-on-Trent North MP Joan Walley called for an enquiry at Parliament, but no enquiry was made. Vale drew 1–1 at Preston, but won 3–1 at home with a Beckford hat-trick in front of 13,416 supporters. In the final, an equalizing goal by Robbie Earle earned Vale a 1–1 draw at Twerton Park, before Earle scored the only goal of the return leg at Vale Park in front of 17,353 fans. Beckford was the season's top-scorer with 23 goals, whilst Futcher and Earle both bagged nineteen goals.

Finances
On the financial side, a loss of £88,142 was made due to a £333,084 debt on player transfers. Match receipts had risen by £258,000 thanks to an average home crowd of 6,731. Home attendances had risen by 78%, and were the highest since 1969–70. The open market rents raised £122,000 and the Developments Fund donations raised £92,000. The wage bill had risen by 30% to £481,859 and the police bill had quadrupled to £55,202 – described by Bill Bell as an 'absolutely crippling' cost. There was no bank overdraft, but debts had risen to £201,434. The club's shirt sponsors were ABC Minolta Copiers.

Cup competitions
In the FA Cup, Vale progressed past Northern Premier League Southport with a 2–0 victory at Haig Avenue. The television cameras were disappointed not to find a giant-killing, as the non-league side failed to cause the Vale much trouble. They then overcame Bolton Wanderers 2–1 at Burnden Park, after "Trotters" goalkeeper David Felgate proved unable to deal with crosses into the box. Drawn against second-place First Division side Norwich City at Burslem in the third round, they were beaten 3–1 by the "Canaries" in front of 15,697 fans, despite holding the lead for most of the match. The introduction of second-half substitute Robert Fleck changed the match, and he and Andy Townsend got the goals for Norwich.

In the League Cup, a 3–2 home win over Chesterfield and a 1–1 draw at Saltergate were enough to send Vale into the second round against Second Division Ipswich Town. Progress came at a price though, as new signing Paul Atkinson was sidelined after chipping a bone in his ankle. Vale won the home leg against Ipswich 1–0, as they proved the equal of their Second Division opponents. However they were knocked out of the competition with a 3–0 defeat at Portman Road, Ipswich's speedy-attacking play proving too much for the Vale to handle in rainy conditions.

In the Associate Members' Cup, a 1–1 home draw with Fourth Division Hereford United and a 5–1 defeat to Wolverhampton Wanderers at Molineux meant the Vale did not progress past the group stage. Vale had dominated Hereford, but failed to make the game safe before the "Bulls" found an equalizer with 13 minutes left to play. Steve Bull had proven the Vale's undoing at "Wolves", as he found the net four times.

League table

Results
Port Vale's score comes first

Football League Third Division

Results by matchday

Matches

Third Division play-offs

FA Cup

League Cup

Associate Members' Cup

Player statistics

Appearances

Top scorers

Transfers

Transfers in

Transfers out

Loans in

Loans out

References
Specific

General

Port Vale F.C. seasons
Port Vale